This is a list of notable medical and scientific journals that publish articles in pharmacology and the pharmaceutical sciences.

The AAPS Journal
AAPS PharmSciTech
Acta Pharmacologica Sinica
Advanced Drug Delivery Reviews
American Journal of Health-System Pharmacy
American Journal of Pharmaceutical Education
The Annals of Pharmacotherapy
Annual Review of Pharmacology and Toxicology
Asian Journal of Pharmaceutics
Biochemical Pharmacology
BioImpacts
Biomedicine & Pharmacotherapy
British Journal of Clinical Pharmacology
British Journal of Pharmacology
Canadian Pharmacists Journal
China Pharmacy
Clinical Pharmacokinetics
Clinical Pharmacology & Therapeutics
Clinical Therapeutics
Current Drug Delivery
Current Drug Metabolism
Current Opinion in Pharmacology
Current Pharmaceutical Design
DARU Journal of Pharmaceutical Sciences
Drug Delivery
Drug Design, Development and Therapy
Drug Development and Industrial Pharmacy
Drug Discovery Today
Drug, Healthcare and Patient Safety
Drug Safety
Drug Metabolism Reviews
Drug Testing and Analysis
European Heart Journal - Cardiovascular PharmacotherapyEuropean Journal of Pharmaceutical SciencesEuropean Journal of Pharmaceutics and BiopharmaceuticsEuropean Journal of PharmacologyExpert Opinion on Biological TherapyExpert Opinion on Drug DeliveryExpert Opinion on Drug DiscoveryExpert Opinion on Drug Metabolism & ToxicologyExpert Opinion on Drug SafetyExpert Opinion on Emerging DrugsExpert Opinion on Investigational DrugsExpert Opinion on PharmacotherapyExpert Opinion on Therapeutic PatentsExpert Opinion on Therapeutic TargetsFrontiers in Drug DeliveryFrontiers in Drug DiscoveryFrontiers in Molecular MedicineInternational Journal of Pharma and Bio SciencesFrontiers in PharmacologyIndian Journal of Pharmaceutical SciencesIndian Journal of PharmacologyInternational Journal of Clinical PharmacyInternational Journal of NanomedicineInternational Journal of NeuropsychopharmacologyInternational Journal of Pharma and Bio SciencesInternational Journal of PharmaceuticsJournal of Biomedical NanotechnologyThe Journal of Clinical PharmacologyJournal of Controlled ReleaseJournal of EthnopharmacologyJournal of Generic MedicinesJournal of MicroencapsulationJournal of Oncology Pharmacy PracticeJournal of Pharmacy PracticeJournal of Pharmaceutical SciencesJournal of Pharmacy and Bioallied SciencesJournal of Pharmacy and Pharmaceutical SciencesJournal of Pharmacy and PharmacologyJournal of Pharmacy PracticeJournal of Pharmacy Practice and ResearchJournal of the American Pharmacists AssociationMolecular PharmaceuticsNature Reviews Drug DiscoveryNeuropharmacologyPharmaceutical Development and TechnologyThe Pharmaceutical JournalPharmaceutical ResearchPharmacognosy CommunicationsPharmacognosy MagazinePharmacognosy ResearchPharmacognosy ReviewsPharmacological ResearchPharmacological ReviewsPharmacology & TherapeuticsPharmacotherapyPhytotherapy ResearchScientia PharmaceuticaTrends in Pharmacological Sciences''

See also

Lists of academic journals

Pharmaceutical sciences

Journals